Juan Sebastián Cárdenas (born 1978) is a Colombian writer and translator. He was born in Popayán in the southwestern province of Cauca. He studied philosophy at the Javeriana University of Bogotá before moving to Madrid in 1998, where he continued his studies at Complutense University and worked for several publishing houses. He has published half a dozen works of fiction. As a translator, he has translated works by American writers such as William Faulkner, Thomas Wolfe and Gordon Lish, Portuguese author Eça de Queirós and Brazilian author Machado de Assis.

In 2017, he was named as one of the Bogota39, a selection of the best young writers in Latin America.

References

Colombian writers
1978 births
Living people